Ma Lin (born on July 28, 1962 in Qiqihar, Heilongjiang) is a Chinese football manager and a former international football player.

As a player, he was a striker who represented Liaoning FC where he won six league titles and three Chinese FA Cups as well as the 1989-90 Asian Club Championship. As a manager he gained his first Head coach appointment at his former club Liaoning FC. He has since gone on to manage Chongqing Lifan, Jiangsu Sainty and returned to Liaoning FC on two further occasions.

Playing career
Ma Lin began his football career playing Liaoning FC where he would show excellent ball control, skill and shooting ability as well a threatening heading ability for his height at an early age, which would soon see him win his first league title in the 1985 league season. He wouldn't have to wait long before he was called up to the national team where he was included in the 1986 Asian Games and would establish himself as China's first choice striker throughout the tournament. His international career would see him play in the 1988 AFC Asian Cup, 1988 Summer Olympics and narrowly miss out on qualification for the 1990 FIFA World Cup. In the domestic league Ma Lin with Liaoning FC would dominate the Chinese game where they won several league, cup as well as 1989-90 Asian Club Championship. After winning everything with Liaoning Ma Lin would try his hand in a foreign league and play in the Japan Soccer League with NKK S.C. on loan, however when the loan period was finished he returned to Liaoning until the 1995 league season when he joined Dalian Wanda FC for one season before retiring as a player.

International goals

Management career
After he retired Ma Lin would take up coaching where he started off with Dalian Yiteng F.C. as an assistant before joining Liaoning once more as one of their assistants. After the team's head coach Dimitar Penev left during the 2003 league season Ma Lin would go on to be promoted as the team's manager where he would lead them to a mid-table sixth-place  finish. He would then be given a full season to manage the squad and go on to lead the team to an improved fourth-place finish, however despite this improvement Ma Lin was allowed to leave and was replaced by the experienced coach Wang Hongli. He would take over the management position at Chongqing Lifan at the beginning of the 2005 league season where he was unable to improve the team's fortunes as a lowly club within the top tier and left after one season. He would then take the management position at second tier side Jiangsu Sainty F.C. where he unable to aid them in their promotion push and resigned during the league season. After a short period outside management Ma Lin returned to Liaoning after Werner Lorant was sacked and was brought in to help the team in their relegation battle during the 2008 league season. Unable to achieve this the club stuck with Ma Lin and he immediately repaid their loyalty by winning the division title and re-promotion back to the top tier after only one season.

On 26 November 2017 Ma Lin was appointed the new manager at Dalian Yifang.
 On 20 March 2018, he was relieved of duty as manager of Dalian Yifang and replaced by Bernd Schuster.

Honours

Player
Liaoning FC
 Chinese Jia-A League: 1985, 1987, 1988, 1990, 1991, 1993
 Chinese FA Cup: 1984, 1986
 Asian Club Championship: 1989–1990

Manager
Liaoning FC
 China League One: 2009

References

External links
 Profile at sodasoccer.com
 Profile at news.nen.com.cn
 International stats at teamchina
 

1962 births
Living people
Sportspeople from Qiqihar
Chinese football managers
Chinese footballers
Footballers from Heilongjiang
China international footballers
Liaoning F.C. players
Dalian Shide F.C. players
Chinese expatriate footballers
Expatriate footballers in Japan
Footballers at the 1988 Summer Olympics
1988 AFC Asian Cup players
Olympic footballers of China
Jiangsu F.C. managers
Liaoning F.C. managers
Dalian Professional F.C. managers
Chongqing Liangjiang Athletic F.C. managers
Footballers at the 1986 Asian Games
Footballers at the 1990 Asian Games
Association football forwards
Asian Games competitors for China
Chinese Super League managers